Princess Victoria  (Victoria Alexandra Olga Mary; 6 July 1868 – 3 December 1935) was the fourth child and second daughter of King Edward VII and Queen Alexandra, and the younger sister of King George V.

Early life and education 

Victoria Alexandra Olga Maria was born on 6 July 1868 at Marlborough House, London. She was the fourth child of Albert Edward, Prince of Wales and his wife Alexandra, Princess of Wales. Victoria's father was the eldest son of Queen Victoria and Prince Albert. Her mother was the eldest daughter of King Christian IX and Queen Louise of Denmark. Among those close to her, the princess was known as Toria. From birth, as the granddaughter of the British monarch, she had the title Her Royal Highness Princess Victoria of Wales.

She was baptised at Marlborough House on 6 August 1868 by Archibald Campbell Tait, Bishop of London.

Personal life 
In 1885, Victoria was a bridesmaid at the wedding of her aunt Princess Beatrice to Prince Henry of Battenberg. She was also a bridesmaid at the wedding of her brother George, Duke of York and Victoria Mary of Teck, the future King and Queen of the United Kingdom.

Princess Victoria was educated at home with her sisters. The princess grew up at Marlborough House and Sandringham under the supervision of tutors. She occasionally spent the summer in Denmark, her mother's homeland. In her youth, she was described as "a lively, mischievous girl ... smart, tall and elegant; she had a wonderful sense of humour and was a good friend to everyone; she had big expressive blue eyes; there was no pretense or hint of a high position in her." Victoria loved horse riding, cycling, reading, listening to music and dancing. The princess's particular passion was photography. She compiled several albums of family photographs. Victoria's works have been displayed at several different exhibitions. She was very fond of animals. Her favorites were dogs named Sam, Mas and Punchy. For six years Victoria had a tamed pigeon, which she took with her on walks and travels in a small basket.

Victoria maintained friendly relations with her cousins in Russia and Greece. The future Emperor Nicholas II of Russia, who was her first cousin (her mother's sister's son), and exactly the same age as her, was in love with her in his youth. The Tsarevich liked Victoria for her seriousness, thoroughness, and "unfeminine mind." In 1889, describing the princess, Nicholas told his close friend, Grand Duke Alexander Mikhailovich: "She is a truly wonderful creature, and the more and deeper you delve into her soul, the clearer you see all her virtues and qualities. I must confess that it is very difficult to figure it out at first, i.e. to learn her view of things and people, but this difficulty is a special charm for me, which I am unable to explain." The princess also caught the eyes of Grand Duke Alexander Mikhailovich, and later, Grand Duke Michael Alexandrovich was fascinated by her.

Another candidate to seek Victoria's hand in marriage was her cousin, Crown Prince Christian of Denmark, who later became Christian X. The princess rejected him, much to the disappointment of her parents. Yet another contender for marriage was the Portuguese king Carlos I. He demanded that Victoria accept the Catholic faith, which did not sit well with her parents. The 5th Earl of Rosebery also attempted to win her attention, in vain. Victoria never married, and her mother was said to be supportive of this decision. 

Victoria was particularly close to her parents, and if she appeared in public, it was usually in their company, as was usual in those days for a spinster. The princess accompanied her parents during official events and ceremonies, and helped them in private life. Her first cousin, the Grand Duchess Olga Alexandrovna of Russia, remarked in later life that she "felt so very sorry" for Victoria, as she seemed within her family to be "a glorified maid to her mother," attributing her staying unmarried to a disinclination to oppose her mother. "I'd something of a rebel in me. Toria had not."

Close as she was to her parents, the person to whom Victoria was closest was her older brother George, who in 1910 became king and emperor. Throughout their lives, which ended within a month of each other, the king-emperor and his sister maintained a warm relationship. They had similar characters and a mutual sense of humour. When Victoria died in 1935, the king said: "How I will miss our daily phone calls. Nobody had such a sister as I had." The king died a month after the death of his sister. Victoria, however, was not close to George's wife, Queen Mary, née Princess Mary of Teck, once describing her as "terribly boring". This was attributed to their different characters, education and interests.

Later years and death 

Between 22 and 24 March 1905, Princess Victoria, along with her mother, her sister Maud (future Queen Maud of Norway) and her brother-in-law Carl (future Haakon VII, King of Norway), made an official visit to Portugal on the royal yacht HMY Victoria and Albert following a visit by the Portuguese monarch to the United Kingdom a year prior. On the first day of her arrival, Victoria stayed on the royal yacht due to poor health. Queen Alexandra with her daughter Princess Maud and Prince Carl met with Queen Amelia and Queen Dowager Maria Pia. The next day, accompanied by her sister, Victoria paid a visit to the king, queen and their sons. On 24 March the British guests left for their homeland.

After her father's death in 1910, Victoria remained in the shadow of her mother. Queen Alexandra suffered from constant depression and was practically deaf. Victoria accompanied her mother during her visits to various institutions and on holidays. Once, when the dowager queen was unable to attend the charity event Alexandra Rose Day, she sent her daughters Louise and Victoria together, and the latter later recorded in her diary that "it was terrible to be there without dear Mama." With continuing public hostility towards Germany during World War I, King George V decided to renounce all German titles and honours. He asked all members of the royal family to do the same. The king renamed the ruling dynasty from Saxe-Coburg and Gotha to Windsor, after his favourite castle. Princess Victoria followed suit and adopted the surname Windsor.

After the death of Queen Alexandra in 1925, Victoria moved to the small town of Coppins, Iver, in Buckinghamshire, where she lived until her death. In her final years, Victoria enjoyed listening to music, gardening, and taking an active part in addressing local issues and problems. Victoria became a patron to the young cellist Beatrice Harrison and her sisters May and Margaret, who also studied music, and she paid for Harrison's valuable Guarneri cello. Victoria received the Harrison sisters regularly at her home and at Sandringham, and attended concerts at the Wigmore Hall with them. She also commissioned HMV to make her some private recordings in August 1928: the recordings, capturing Victoria at the piano accompanying Beatrice Harrison on the cello and May Harrison on the violin, would many years later be commercially released, though Victoria's musicianship would generate mixed reviews.

Other friends of Victoria included members of the Musgrave family, the widowed 5th Earl of Rosebery, and Violet Vivian, a former lady-in-waiting to Queen Alexandra. Lady Musgrave was Victoria's lifelong friend and lady-in-waiting. The princess assisted Violet Vivian in the design of the Cestyll Garden near the village of Cemaes on the northwest coast of Anglesey.

Victoria died in the early hours of 3 December 1935 at the age of 67 at her home. She had been in poor health over the previous month, culminating in a severe haemorrhage on 1 December. The State Opening of Parliament, planned for 3 December, was cancelled in response to her death, and instead the already-written King's Speech was read to Parliamentarians by the Lord Chancellor without ceremony.

Her funeral took place on 7 December 1935 at St George's Chapel, Windsor Castle, where she was initially buried. The mourners at the funeral included Victoria's brother George V. George himself was in poor health, and his doctor pushed for the funeral service to be shortened; he was unsuccessful, and George's final deterioration and death soon after would later be blamed on the physical strain of the long event. Victoria's remains were later moved and reburied at the Royal Burial Ground, Frogmore, Windsor Great Park, on 8 January 1936. Her will was sealed in London in 1936. Her estate was valued at £237,455 (or £11.7 million in 2022 when adjusted for inflation).

Titles, styles, honours and arms

Titles and styles
6 July 1868 – 22 January 1901: Her Royal Highness Princess Victoria of Wales
22 January 1901 – 3 December 1935: Her Royal Highness The Princess Victoria

Honours
Imperial Order of the Crown of India, 6 August 1887
Dame Grand Cross of the Order of the Hospital of St. John of Jerusalem
Member First Class of the Royal Order of Victoria and Albert
Royal Family Order of King Edward VII
Royal Family Order of King George V

Arms
Upon her younger sister's marriage in 1896, Princess Victoria was awarded a personal coat of arms, being the Royal Arms of the United Kingdom, bearing an inescutcheon of the shield of Saxony and differenced with a label argent of five points, the first, third and fifth bearing roses gules, and the second and fourth crosses gules. The inescutcheon was dropped by royal warrant in 1917.

Ancestors

References

Bibliography 
 
 
 
 
 
 
 

1868 births
1935 deaths
19th-century British people
20th-century British people
19th-century British women
20th-century British women
House of Saxe-Coburg and Gotha (United Kingdom)
House of Windsor
British princesses
Women of the Victorian era
Ladies of the Royal Order of Victoria and Albert
Companions of the Order of the Crown of India
People from Westminster
Dames Grand Cross of the Order of St John
Burials at the Royal Burial Ground, Frogmore
Children of Edward VII
Daughters of emperors
Royal reburials
Daughters of kings